Velleeswarar Temple is a Hindu temple in Mylapore, Chennai, Tamil nadu, India. The presiding deity is Shiva in the form of Velleeswarar. This mid-sized temple, spread over 2 acres is one amongst the Seven Shiva Temples of Mylapore that have been in existence since yore. It is situated at South Mada Street, closer to Sri Kapaleeswarar Temple.

Sapta Sthana Shiva temples
This temple is one of the Sapta Sthana Shiva temples in Mylapore area. (one of the seven sacred Shiva temples in Mylapore). They are:

 Karaneeswarar Temple
 Tirttapaleeswarar Temple
 Velleeswarar Temple
 Virupakshiswarar Temple
 Valeeswarar Temple
 Malleeswarar Temple
 Kapaleeshwarar Temple

In addition to these "Sapta Sthana Shiva sthalas", the Ekambareshwarar–Valluvar temple in the neighbourhood is traditionally considered the indispensable eighth.

Legend 

According to popular legend, when the king Mahabali was about to grant Vamana, an incarnation of Vishnu, gifts of land as part of Yagna Dhana, Sukracharya, the preceptor of the Asuras, tried to stop him as he suspected foul play. But Bali was insistent that he cannot stop Dhaanam to a young Brahmachari Brahmin. Sukracharya then changed his form to that of a bee and went into the nozzle of the kamandalu, blocking water flow. Lord Vamana on seeing this, pricked the nozzle with a blade of darbha grass, which blinded Sukracharya.

Sukracharya meditated upon Shiva at this place in Mylapore and got his eyesight back.

The Temple 

The Temple is a fairly mid-sized Temple with a five-tier vimana facing south. On entering the Temple, the first deity we see is that of Lord Ganesha in standing posture with his consorts Siddhi and Buddhi. This posture of Ganesha is said to be rare. We come next to the Shrine of Lord Velleeswara in the form of a Linga facing East. The next shrine that we see is that of Goddess Kamakshi. The Goddess faces south.  We can view the idols of the Saptamathrikas installed as we circumambulate Lord Shiva's Shrine. Goddess Varahi is much venerated here. We also come across an Idol of Lord Vishnu in TriVikrama posture behind Lord Shiva's Shrine, and Devi Durga (facing north), and as we proceed further we come to the Shrine of Lord Kartikeya sanctified here as Lord Muthukumaraswamy. The deities of the Lord can be seen along with his consorts Valli and Devasena in standing posture.

We then proceed to the outer courtyard after crossing the Idol of Lord Bhairava and immediately on the left we can see the shrines for Lord Sarabeshwara, a small shrine for Goddess Pratyangira Devi and Sukracharya praying to Lord Shiva. Also in the outer courtyard we find shrines of Lord Shaneeswara and the Navagrahas. The Flagstaff is installed in the outer courtyard.

Mythology 

Vellee means Sukra, and Velleeswara is Lord of Sukracharya. Sri Sukracharya worshipped the Lord here and got back the eyesight he lost at the hands of Lord Vamana. You can see the statue form of Sri Sukra worshipping the Lord here in this temple.

There are many who say that unless they are able to see God with their own eyes, they can't believe in the Divine. How can such arrogance "see" God when it takes aeons for a serious devotee to "see" God, ask the Siddhas. Yes, God can be "seen", they assure us, but first one has to get the right spiritual training. In the process of this training, one's eyes will be empowered with that spiritual vision that can perceive God. It is this eyesight that Sri Velleeswarar can bless us with.

Furthermore, the eyes are the windows of the soul. In this Kali Yuga, our eyes look at all kinds of scenes and become the entry points for all kinds of desires. It is Sri Velleeswarar who can protect us from falling prey to the desires inflamed by our eyes. It is He who can also give us the blessing that our eyes see only which is good for us.

In the material world, Sri Velleeswara is the divine eye doctor who can solve eye-related diseases and problems. The Siddhas instruct all eye doctors to offer worship at this shrine.

See also

 Religion in Chennai

References 

 

Hindu temples in Chennai